The Devon Junior Cup is an annual rugby union knock-out club competition organized by the Devon Rugby Football Union. It was first introduced in the 1888–89 season when it was won by Paignton. During the pre-war years the Devon Junior Cup was open to lower ranked teams in the county, along with the reserve sides of the larger clubs such as Exeter and Devonport Albion. Like the senior cup competition, the junior cup has periods of inactivity over its history due to World Wars, and was cancelled towards the end of the 1950s only to return in the 1986–87 season when it was won by Exeter Saracens. The Havill Plate was introduced in the 1970s for teams knocked out of the first round of the Devon Senior Cup but later included clubs knocked out of the early stages of the Junior Cup – it was discontinued after the 1998–99 season.

The Junior Cup is the third cup competition in the county behind the Senior Cup and Intermediate Cup, and is open to club sides based in Devon that play in tier 9 (Devon League 1) of the English rugby union league system, as well as the Devon Merit Tables (outside of the league system). The current format is a knock-out cup with a first round, quarter-finals, semi-finals and final, which is played at the home ground of one of the finalists. Also running alongside is a Plate competition for clubs knocked out of the first round of the Devon Junior Cup.  There was also a Vase competition but this has not been contested since 2017.

Devon Junior Cup winners

Devon Junior Plate winners

Devon Junior Vase winners

Number of wins

Cup
Honiton (8)
North Tawton (8)
Exmouth (6)
Totnes (5)
Buckfastleigh (4)
Ivybridge (4)
Kingsteignton (4)
Paignton (4)
Bideford (3)
Brixham (3)
Cullompton (3)
Dartmouth Athletic (3)
Kingsbridge (3)
Crediton (2)
Exeter Saracens (2)
Friernhay (2)
Newton Abbot Reserves (2)
South Molton (2)
Teignmouth (2)
Wessex (2)
Withycombe (2)
Aller Vale (1)
Argyle Athletic (1)
Devonport Albion 'B' (1)
Dartmouth (1)
Devonport Ramblers (1)
Exeter Reserves (1)
Ilfracombe (1)
Melville (1)
Okehampton (1)
Old Technicians (1)
Plymouth Barbarians (1)
Seaton (1)
Sidmouth (1)
St. Chads (1)
Tavistock (1)
Tiverton Heathcoat (1)
Torquay Athletic Juniors (1)
Torrington (1)

Plate
North Tawton (2)
Plymouth Argaum (2)
Buckfastleigh Ramblers (1)
Ilfracombe (1)
New Cross (1)
Tamar Saracens (1)
Wessex (1)

Vase
New Cross (2)
North Tawton (1)
 Exeter Saracens (1)
Old Technicians (1)
Plymouth Barbarians (1)
Plymstock Albion Oaks (1)
Topsham (1)

Notes

See also
 Devon RFU
 Devon Senior Cup
 Devon Intermediate Cup
 David Butt Memorial Trophy
 Havill Plate
 English rugby union system
 Rugby union in England

References

External links
 Devon RFU

Recurring sporting events established in 1889
1889 establishments in England
Rugby union cup competitions in England
Rugby union in Devon